Mbabane Swallows Football Club is a Eswatini football club based in Mbabane.

The club was established in 1948. It was the first Swazi club to participate in the CAF Champions League, when they did it in 2018.

Achievements
Premier League of Eswatini: 7
 1993, 2005, 2009, 2012, 2013, 2017, 2018.
Swazi FA Cup: 4
 1986, 2006, 2013, 2016.
Swazi Charity Cup: 6
 1993, 1999, 2004, 2014, 2017, 2018
Swazi League Cup: 6
 1997, 1999, 2007, 2016, 2017, 2018
Swazi top 8 Cup:
 2013,2015,2016
PLS Ultimate Cup: 1
 2012
King Mswati III Cup: 1
 2015
Mbabane Mayoral Cup (Town Century celebration): 1
 2002

Performance in CAF competitions
CAF Champions League: 6 appearances
1998 – Preliminary Round
2006 – Preliminary Round
2010 – Preliminary Round
2014 – Preliminary Round
2015 – Preliminary Round
2018 – Group stage

African Cup of Champions Clubs: 1 appearance
1994 – Preliminary Round

CAF Confederation Cup: 2 appearances
2017 - Group Stage
2021 - withdrew in Preliminary Round

CAF Cup: 1 appearance
1995 – First Round

CAF Cup Winners' Cup: 1 appearance
1987 – Preliminary Round

African record

Squad
as of 1 May 2018

Staff
Management

Chairman:
 Victor Gamedze (The late-2018)

CEO:
 Sibusiso Manana (The late-2017) 

General manager:
 Sandile Zwane

Sports

Head coach:
 N/A

Assistant coach:
 Siyabonga Bhembe

Notable coaches
  Walter Rautmann
  Alou Badara
  Jani Simulambo
 Nyanga ‘Crooks’ Hlophe (2013)
  Chris Tembo (2014)
 Siyabonga Bhembe

Crest

Notable former players
All players presented during his career the nationalside of his homeland.

Berry Sonnenschein

 Jocial Chakunte

 Thibault Tchicaya

 Demba Senyang

 Sumalia John Uyin

 Ifeanyi Ezewudo
 Olayeni Fashina
 Jimoh Moses

 Thabiso Maharala
 Kingsley Ncongo

 Mfanafuthi Taribo Bhembe
 Musa Dlamini
 Dennis Fakudze
 Menzi Gamedze
 Sipho Gumbi
 Manqoba Kunene
 Sifiso Mabila
 Mzwandile Mamba
 Sifiso Maseko
 Civil Matsebula
 Wandile Mazibuko
 Sandile Mdlovu
 Sidell Mgonodi
 Sandile Humphrey Motsa
 Mfanufikile Ndzimande

 Mlungisi Ngubane
 Bongiswa Nhlabatsi
 Gcina Joe Simelane
 Bright Zondo

 Ephraim Mazarura
 Stanford Ncube

Notes

External links
Premiere League of Eswatini – Official website

Association football clubs established in 1969
Football clubs in Eswatini
Mbabane